Giulia Occhini (born in Varano Borghi, 23 July 1922 – died in Novi Ligure, 6 January 1993), known as "La Dama Bianca" (“The White Lady”), was the lover of champion cyclist Fausto Coppi in a scandalous extramarital affair of the 1950s.

Given Coppi’s high profile, this affair led to the shift in attitudes among the Christian Democrats in Italy towards the moral and legal aspects of adultery. At the time in Italy, divorce was not permitted and adultery was still a crime. Occhini herself was tried for abandoning her marriage. Her story became emblematic of the conformist and repressive climate of that period.

Her nickname originated after the 1954 St. Moritz stage of the Giro d'Italia, when Pierre Chany, a journalist with L'Équipe, wrote: "We would like to know more about that lady in white (dame en blanc) we saw near Coppi,” referring to the snow-coloured duffel coat she wore.

Biography 

Occhini was married to Enrico Locatelli, a medical practitioner in Varano Borghi, and who was  a passionate fan of Coppi. She met Fausto Coppi during the 1953 Tour at the end of the Passo dello Stelvio stage and publicly appeared with the "Campionissimo" at the World Championships Prize 1953 in Lugano. Their friendship started in 1948 when the Locatelli had asked his wife to obtain an autograph of the "Campionissimo" at the end of the Tre Valli Varesine. Later Occhini entered into correspondence with Coppi, who, solicited by Locatelli, personally met his family in a short visit to Varese. A romance began between Occhini and Coppi and they spent the summer together as lovers in 1953, vacationing in Capri.

Since they were both married, the relationship aroused great scandal at that time and was strongly opposed by public opinion, particularly by Fausto Coppi's fans, and Occhini was even the recipient of Pope Pius XII's public condemnation. Coppi and his wife, Bruna Ciampolini, unanimously separated in 1954, while Locatelli denounced Occhini for adultery. As a result of this, according to Italian law of time, the lovers having been caught “in flagrante”, the woman was punished with a month's imprisonment in Alessandria and then a period of house arrest in Ancona. Coppi’s passport was withdrawn. Among these many difficulties, Coppi and Occhini married in Mexico (a marriage never recognized in Italy) and Occhini gave birth to a son, Angelo Fausto Coppi, who was born on May 13, 1955 in Buenos Aires.

Coppi died of malaria on January 2, 1960, which he caught on a trip to Burkina Faso.

Giulia Occhini was admitted to San Giacomo Hospital in Novi Ligure following injuries sustained in a car accident that occurred just in front of Villa Coppi in hamlet Barbellotta of Novi Ligure on 3 August 1991 on board a Fiat Tipo, driven by a family friend, who was hit by a Volkswagen Golf GTI with two young people on board. She died on January 6, 1993, after having been in a coma for almost a year and a half. Giulia Occhini is buried in the new graveyard of Serravalle Scrivia, next to her daughter Loretta "Lolli" Locatelli (1946–1981), who died of leukemia.

The "white lady" in popular culture
 Giulia Occhini appeared as a character in the 1995 telemovie Il Grande Fausto ("The Great Fausto"), played by Ornella Muti 
 She was also portrayed in the 2006 miniseries Gino Bartali – Il intramontabile ("Gino Bartali – The Timeless"), played by Valentina Bruscoli.
 Italian bicycle manufacturer Bianchi, which had close ties to Coppi, uses the brand "Dama Bianca" for its range of women's bicycles.

Notes

Bibliography
 Adriano De Zan, Pier Augusto Stagi, Gentili signori e signore buongiorno. Cinquant'anni di ciclismo, Milano, Baldini&Castoldi, 1999, .
 Gabriele Moroni, Fausto Coppi. Solitudine di un campione, Milano, Mursia, 2009, .

External links

 

1993 deaths
Road incident deaths in Italy
1922 births